The 2008 Laurie O'Reilly Cup was the seventh edition of the competition and was held between 14 and 18 October at Canberra. New Zealand retained the O'Reilly Cup after winning both matches.

It was the first time since 1998 that the Black Ferns crossed the Tasman for two rugby internationals against the Wallaroos. It was also the first women's rugby internationals played in Australia since the Wallaroos 2001 Test against England.

Table

Results

1st Test

Source:

2nd Test

Source:

Squads

Australia
The Wallaroos named a 35–player squad for the O'Reilly Cup.

New Zealand

References 

Laurie O'Reilly Cup
Australia women's national rugby union team
New Zealand women's national rugby union team
Laurie O'Reilly Cup